Brendan Uegama is a cinematographer, shooting feature films and series work.  He resides in Los Angeles and is best known for his work on Child's Play (2019), Riverdale (2017 TV series)  and Chilling Adventures of Sabrina.  Brendan is also the cofounder of "Black Tree Pictures", a production company he runs with his partner Nicole G. Leier.

Filmography

References

Canadian cinematographers
Living people
Year of birth missing (living people)